Kimmo Rintanen (born August 7, 1973 in Rauma, Finland) is a former professional ice hockey player who played in the SM-liiga before getting transferred to Swiss Elite League Team Kloten Flyers, where he played from the 2001-02 season until 2010-11, before his final season at HC Lugano in 2011-12. Before his international career, he played for Lukko, TPS, and Jokerit in Finland.  He also won a bronze medal at the 1998 Winter Olympics. Rintanen has played 155 matches for the National team of Finland and has scored 35 goals. Starting in 2015 he has been an assistant coach for TPS in Finland.

Career statistics

Regular season and playoffs

International

External links 

1973 births
Finnish ice hockey left wingers
HC Lugano players
Jokerit players
EHC Kloten players
Living people
Lukko players
HC TPS players
Olympic ice hockey players of Finland
Ice hockey players at the 1998 Winter Olympics
Olympic bronze medalists for Finland
Olympic medalists in ice hockey
Medalists at the 1998 Winter Olympics
People from Rauma, Finland
Sportspeople from Satakunta